Ubaid Ullah Mayar is a Pakistani politician who had been a Member of the Provincial Assembly of Khyber Pakhtunkhwa, from May 2013 to May 2018.His wife is also a beaurecrate ...he has one son and one daughter..

Political career

He was elected to the Provincial Assembly of Khyber Pakhtunkhwa as a candidate of Pakistan Tehreek-e-Insaf from Constituency PK-25 Mardan-III in 2013 Pakistani general election. He received 16,851 votes and defeated a candidate of Awami National Party.

In March 2018, he was accused of horse-trading in the 2018 Senate election. Following which Imran Khan announced to expel him from the PTI and issued him a show cause notice to explain his position. In April 2018, he quit PTI and joined Pakistan Peoples Party.

References

Living people
Khyber Pakhtunkhwa MPAs 2013–2018
1978 births